Ilfat Razyapov (born 23 November 1975) is a Russian boxer. He competed in the men's flyweight event at the 2000 Summer Olympics.

References

1975 births
Living people
Russian male boxers
Olympic boxers of Russia
Boxers at the 2000 Summer Olympics
AIBA World Boxing Championships medalists
Flyweight boxers